XHLAZ-FM is a radio station on 93.5 FM in Tamaliagua and Ciudad Guzmán, Jalisco, Mexico, broadcasting from a transmitter in Gómez Farías Municipality.

History
XEWP-AM 1420 received its concession on August 26, 1964. It was owned by Carmen Rodríguez de Méndez and operated from Sayula as a 500-watt daytimer.

In 1977, XEWP was sold to José Antonio Aguilar Herrera and became XEKMX-AM, later moving to 600 kHz and increasing power to 5,000 watts. During this time period, it was known as La Super X. It changed its calls again, to XELAZ-AM. The callsign change reflected the "La Z" name in use at that time.

XELAZ was approved to migrate to FM as XHLAZ-FM in 2011. The station used the La Mejor brand from MVS Radio from that time until the end of April 2022. On June 1 became a new format as La Luperrona  a grupera format.

References

Radio stations in Jalisco